The 2018 Maryland Terrapins men's soccer team represented the University of Maryland, College Park during the 2018 NCAA Division I men's soccer season. It was the 73rd season of the university fielding a program. The Terrapins were led by 26th year head coach, Sasho Cirovski.

Despite a relatively poor regular season performance in Big Ten play, a strong RPI allowed the Terps to earn an at-large berth as the 11th seed in the NCAA Tournament. In the tournament, the Terps went on their 14th ever College Cup run.

Background 

Ahead of the 2018 season, seven year assistant coach, Brian Rowland, left Maryland to take the head coaching position at Temple.

Player movement

Departures

Squad information

Roster 
As of August 16, 2018

Coaching staff 

{|class="wikitable"
|-
! style="background:#E03A3E; color:#fff; border:2px solid #FFD520;" scope="col" colspan="2"|Front office
|-

|-
! style="background:#E03A3E; color:#fff; border:2px solid #FFD520;" scope="col" colspan="2"|Coaching staff
|-

Schedule 

|-
!colspan=8 style=""| Regular season

|-
!colspan=8 style=""| Big Ten Tournament
|-

|-
!colspan=8 style=""| NCAA Tournament
|-

Statistics

Appearances and goals

Discipline

Summary

Awards

See also 
 2018 Maryland Terrapins women's soccer team

References 

Maryland Terrapins men's soccer seasons
Maryland Terrapins
Maryland Terrapins men's soccer
Maryland Terrapins
Maryland
NCAA Division I Men's Soccer Tournament College Cup seasons
NCAA Division I Men's Soccer Tournament-winning seasons